Happy Harmonies is the name of a series of thirty-seven animated cartoons distributed by Metro-Goldwyn-Mayer and produced by Hugh Harman and Rudolf Ising between 1934 and 1938.

Produced in Technicolor, these cartoons were very similar to Walt Disney's Silly Symphonies. They would occasionally feature Bosko, a character who starred in the first Looney Tunes shorts that the duo produced for Leon Schlesinger. After the first two releases, the design of Bosko changed from an "ink blot" to a more realistic African American boy.

The two final titles in the series were originally produced by Harman and Ising as Silly Symphonies cartoons. Disney originally had Harman and Ising create three shorts for Disney, but when they only kept one of their three shorts, "Merbabies", the copyrights to the other two ("Pipe Dreams" and "The Little Bantamweight") were sold to MGM who released them as Happy Harmonies.

List of cartoons

1934

1935

1936

1937

1938

Home media 
The only official home release to date containing a significant number of the Happy Harmonies film shorts is the Happy Harmonies Cartoon Classics laserdisc box set. The laserdisc set was released in 1994 by MGM/UA Home Video, which predated the merger of Turner Broadcasting System with Time Warner in 1996. The four-disc set contains 17 of the 37 Happy Harmonies shorts while the remaining 25 shorts include one side of six Barney Bear cartoons, the 1939 animated short Peace on Earth and the 1940 animated short The Milky Way. In 1999, MGM paid Time Warner $225 million to end its lease of distributing content owned by Turner Entertainment prior to 1996 (the cartoons are part of the pre-1986 MGM library which Turner had purchased 13 years previously). While the copyrights remain with Turner, distribution rights are now with Warner Bros., current parent company to Turner.

References

External links 
 

 
Film series introduced in 1934
Animated short film series
Metro-Goldwyn-Mayer animated short films
American animation anthology series
Anthology film series